Great White Death is a 1981 documentary/mondo film about great white sharks narrated by Glenn Ford. The film is notable for its Faces of Death-like footage of actual shark attacks. The film shows Henri Bource, a scuba diver who survived a shark attack in November 1964.

External links

1981 films
American documentary films
American independent films
Canadian documentary films
Troma Entertainment films
Mondo films
Documentary films about nature
Films about sharks
1981 documentary films
1980s English-language films
1980s American films
1980s Canadian films